Amangildino (Amangilde) is a rural locality (a selo) and the administrative center of Amangildinsky Selsoviet, Abzelilovsky District, Bashkortostan, Russia. The population was 651 as of 2010. There are 10 streets.

Geography 
Amangildino is located 25 km west of Askarovo (the district's administrative centre) by road. Kazmashevo is the nearest rural locality.

References 

Rural localities in Abzelilovsky District